Kim Chol-bom (born 16 July 1994) is a North Korean footballer who plays as a defender for April 25 and the North Korea national team.

Career
Kim was included in North Korea's squad for the 2019 AFC Asian Cup in the United Arab Emirates.

Career statistics

International

References

External links
 
 
 
 Kim Chol-bom at WorldFootball.com
Kim Chol-bom at DPRKFootball

1994 births
Living people
People from Nampo
North Korean footballers
North Korea international footballers
North Korea youth international footballers
Association football defenders
Sobaeksu Sports Club players
April 25 Sports Club players
2019 AFC Asian Cup players
Footballers at the 2014 Asian Games
Footballers at the 2018 Asian Games
Asian Games medalists in football
Asian Games silver medalists for North Korea
Medalists at the 2014 Asian Games
21st-century North Korean people